An antheridium is a haploid structure or organ producing and containing male gametes (called antherozoids or sperm). The plural form is antheridia, and a structure containing one or more antheridia is called an androecium. Androecium is also the collective term for the stamens of flowering plants.

Antheridia are present in the gametophyte phase of cryptogams like bryophytes and ferns. Many algae and some fungi, for example ascomycetes and water moulds, also have antheridia during their reproductive stages. In gymnosperms and angiosperms, the male gametophytes have been reduced to pollen grains and in most of these the antheridia have been reduced to a single generative cell within the pollen grain. During pollination, this generative cell divides and gives rise to sperm cells.

The female counterpart to the antheridium in cryptogams is the archegonium, and in flowering plants is the gynoecium.

An antheridium typically consists of sterile cells and spermatogenous tissue. The sterile cells may form a central support structure or surround the spermatogenous tissue as a protective jacket. The spermatogenous cells give rise to spermatids via mitotic cell division. In some bryophytes, the antheridium is borne on an antheridiophore, a stalk-like structure that carries the antheridium at its apex.

Gallery

See also
 Hornworts have antheridia, in some cases arranged within androecia.
 Microsporangia produce spores that give rise to male gametophytes.

References

Further reading
C.Michael Hogan. 2010. Fern. Encyclopedia of Earth. National council for Science and the Environment. Washington, DC

Plant anatomy
Plant reproduction

he:מורפולוגיה של הצמח - מונחים#איברים בצמחים פרימיטיביים